The 2015 FIBA Under-19 World Championship for Women (Russian:2015 Чемпионат мира ФИБА среди юношей до 19 лет среди женщин)was hosted by Russia from 18 to 26 July 2015.

The United States won their seventh title by defeating Russia 78–70 in the final.

Venues
 Sports Palace Olympiskyi, Chekhov
 Vidnoye Sports Centre, Vidnoye

Qualified teams

(*) Japan qualified for the tournament but was suspended by FIBA. A third Asian team had to be named to take Japan's place. The draw took place with the third Asian team's identity yet to be named. On 23 March 2015, Chinese Taipei, fourth-place finisher at the Asia Championship, was confirmed by FIBA to be Japan's replacement.

Preliminary round
The draw for the tournament was held on 12 March 2015 at the House of Basketball in Mies, Switzerland.

All times are local (UTC+3).

Group A

Group B

Group C

Group D

Knockout stage

Bracket

5–8th place bracket

9–16th place bracket

13–16th place bracket

All times are local (UTC+3).

Round of 16

9–16th place quarterfinals

Quarterfinals

13–16th place semifinals

9–12th place semifinals

5–8th place semifinals

Semifinals

Final classification games

Match for 15th place

Match for 13th place

Match for 11th place

Match for 9th place

Match for 7th place

Match for 5th place

Bronze medal match

Final

Final standings

Statistics and awards

Statistical leaders

Points

Rebounds

Assists

Blocks

Steals

Awards

All-Tournament Team
  A'ja Wilson
  Napheesa Collier
  Maria Vadeeva
  Daria Kolosovskaya
  Alanna Smith

References

External links
 Official website

2015
Under-19 World Championship 2015 for Women
World Championship for Women
International basketball competitions hosted by Russia
Sport in Moscow Oblast
2015 in youth sport